Artocarpus anisophyllus, the entawak or mentawa, is a tropical tree in the Moraceae. It is native to the central parts of Southeast Asia, and is present in Peninsular Malaysia, Sumatra, Borneo and the intervening islands. 

It bears round, 3–4 inch long, brownish yellow fruit. The entawak's flesh is orange-red and may taste like a pumpkin in flavor, while it also has edible seeds which are commonly roasted and salted to be eaten. Rarely cultivated in its native range, it is a large rainforest tree growing up to 45 metres. The fruit is eaten fresh and its propagation is by seed. It is a distant relative to the wellknown jackfruit and breadfruit, besides the tasty tarap fruit to which it is closely related. It is propagated by seeds, grafting and cuttings besides other viable methods. While it grows exceedingly well in tropical climates, it is not as well-adapted to subtropical climates. When grown from seed the germination may take 1–3 months and it will probably bear fruit within 8–9 years.

Gallery

See also
 Domesticated plants and animals of Austronesia

References

anisophyllus
Trees of Peninsular Malaysia
Trees of Sumatra
Trees of Borneo
Taxa named by Friedrich Anton Wilhelm Miquel
Plants described in 1861